Walima, or the marriage banquet, is the second of the two traditional parts of an Islamic wedding.  The walima is performed after the nikah  or marriage ceremony.  It designates a feast in  Arabic.  walima is used as a symbol to show domestic happiness in the household post-marriage. While walima is often used to describe a celebration of marriage, it is also held to celebrate the birth of a newborn and the purchase of a new home. As per shariah, Walima only takes place where the groom and bride resides.

Debate: The Time of Walima
Scholars have different views on what the correct time of walima is.  The timing varies by culture and opinion; for example some believe it should take place:
 at the time of the wedding contract (nikah)
 after nikah and prior to consummation
 at the time of the wedding procession (Ibn Hajar, Fath al-Bari, 9/287)
 after consummation.

Other uses of Walima

Walima in literal translation means "to assemble" and is used to describe an assembly or party celebrating major life events.  Walima is essentially interchangeable with American and English terms such as: wedding reception or celebration (when held to celebrate a marriage), birthday party (when held to celebrate the birth of a newborn), or housewarming party (when held to celebrate the purchase of a new home).  Similarly, walima is generally interchangeable with other languages/cultures terms that essentially mean to assemble for the purposes of celebrating a marriage, newborn, or new home.  While it is an Arabic term, it is not necessarily a term reserved for Muslims per se, as the word simply describes the event that is to be celebrated.

See also
 Islamic view of marriage
 Nikah
 Nikah urfi

References

External links
 The Fiqh Of Walima

Marriage in Islam
Wedding traditions
Islamic terminology